Eugene Matthews (1574-1623) was the Roman Catholic Bishop of Clogher from 1609 to 1611; and Archbishop of Dublin from 1611 until his death.

In 1623 he was responsible for the foundation of the Pastoral Irish College at Louvain.

See also
Roman Catholic Diocese of Clogher

References

Roman Catholic bishops of Clogher
17th-century Roman Catholic archbishops in Ireland
Roman Catholic archbishops of Dublin
1623 deaths
1574 births